Absolute gain may refer to:

Gain (electronics), an increase in power or amplitude of a signal across a two-port circuit
Antenna gain, a performance measure combining an antenna's directivity and electrical efficiency
Absolute gain (international relations), in liberal international relations theory